Greatest Party Story Ever is an American animated television series. The series premiered on MTV on January 14, 2016. Produced by Four Peaks Media Group, Den of Thieves, and animated by ShadowMachine. The program holds a TV-14 rating due to language, adult situations, and comedic violence. Episodes re-released with bonus content were titled as Greatest Party Story Ever: The After Party. The second season premiered December 1, 2016. This was the final project produced by MTV Animation.

Plot
The series presents first-person narratives shared by individuals about wild parties they have attended, outrageous and bizarre events they've experienced, encounters with celebrities such as James Franco and Rihanna, crazy hookups, and highly regrettable decisions. The stories are reenacted with unique styles of animation to enhance the humor. Other segments include viewer-submitted party photos, which were later doctored; and outrageous text conversations.

Episodes

Series overview

Season 1 (2016)

Season 2 (2016)

References

External links
 
 

2010s American adult animated television series
2010s American anthology television series
2010s American reality television series
2016 American television series debuts
2016 American television series endings
American adult animation anthology series
American adult animated comedy television series
American flash adult animated television series
American stop-motion adult animated television series
American television shows featuring puppetry
English-language television shows
MTV cartoons
MTV original programming
American television series with live action and animation
Storytelling television shows
Television series by ShadowMachine